John Lewis "Jack" Morrison (born April 6, 1945) is an American former ice hockey athlete and corporate manager.

Early life and education 
Morrison was born in Minneapolis. He attended Phillips Academy, where he captained the hockey and tennis teams. Morrison then graduated from Yale University, where he was the all-time leading scorer for men's hockey with 51 goals and 68 assists, 119 points. He led the team in scoring his senior year with 49 points.

During his time at Yale, Morrison won the William Neely Mallory Award. He is a member of the initial class, along with George H. W. Bush, of the Andover Athletic Hall of Honor. Life profiled Morrison as an outstanding secondary school hockey athlete in 1963.

While attending Yale, he was in the same fraternity as George W. Bush. He later graduated from Harvard Business School.

Career 
Morrison was named a first-team All-American at center in 1967, and then captained the United States men's national ice hockey team at the 1968 Winter Olympics. Herb Brooks was a teammate. The Olympic team finished sixth in the competition, with Morrison its leading scorer. Morrison was tied for eighth place in scoring with Marshall Johnston.

Morrison founded an investment firm, Goldner Hawn Johnson & Morrison, in Minneapolis. He had been an executive at Pillsbury before founding Goldner Hawn. From 2005 to 2010, Morrison served as a member of the President's Intelligence Advisory Board in the Bush administration.

Awards and honors

References
 

1945 births
American men's ice hockey centers
Harvard Business School alumni
Ice hockey people from Minneapolis
Ice hockey players at the 1968 Winter Olympics
Living people
Olympic ice hockey players of the United States
Yale Bulldogs men's ice hockey players
Yale University alumni
AHCA Division I men's ice hockey All-Americans